Law & Order: Dead on the Money is the first in a series of video games based on the television series Law & Order. The game was developed by Legacy Interactive and was first published in September 2002.

Plot
The game's plot revolves around the murder of a Wall Street stock broker who is murdered in Central Park whilst jogging. The player and Detective Briscoe then question a number of people related to the incident, including a park cleaner, coffee vendor, the broker's employer, her lawyer, daughter, and her associates. The player must assess who is the murderer and then take them to trial. The game, like the original format of the show, is separated into two parts. During the first half, the player assumes the part of Junior Detective, working as the partner of Lennie Briscoe, who is tasked with gathering enough evidence to make an arrest. During the second half, the player assumes the part of executive assistant district attorney, who is partnered with DA Serena Southerlyn, with the object of convincing a jury that the defendant is guilty. DA Douglas Wade, played by Victor Brandt, is a character created exclusively for the game who does not appear in the main show.

Reception

Sales
Law & Order: Dead on the Money was a commercial success that surpassed its developer's expectations. By August 2003, it had sold 180,000 units; in the United States alone, more than 120,000 copies were sold by September. PC Data tracked 55,956 domestic sales of the game during 2003 alone. Legacy Interactive's Christina Oliver Taylor said at the time, "Frankly, we weren't sure how popular the game would be, given reports of decreasing sales trends for both adventure games and PC games, but we were counting on the enthusiasm of the Law & Order fans, and they really came through." In early 2004, Lorraine Lue of DreamCatcher Interactive's European branch likewise reported that Dead on the Money had performed "very, very well" worldwide, and singled out the United Kingdom as a successful market for the game.

Critical reviews

The game received "mixed or average reviews" from critics, according to the review aggregation website Metacritic.

References

External links
 

2002 video games
Adventure games
Crime investigation simulators
MacOS games
Video games about police officers
Video games developed in the United States
Video games set in New York City
Windows games
Video games based on Law & Order (franchise)
The Adventure Company games
Single-player video games
Aspyr games
Legacy Games games